Lesley Hawker (born May 1, 1981) is a Canadian former competitive figure skater. She is the 2003 Winter Universiade bronze medallist, the 2003 Nebelhorn Trophy silver medallist, and a two-time Canadian national bronze medallist.

Personal life 
Hawker was born on May 1, 1981, in North York, Ontario. She is the eldest of ten children in her family. She worked as a waitress during her skating career.

She married Jamie Doherty in June 2006.

Career 
Hawker began skating in 1987. In January 2003, she won the bronze medal at the Winter Universiade in Tarvisio after placing eighth in the short program and third in the free skate. In September, she won silver at the 2003 Nebelhorn Trophy in Oberstdorf, having placed second in both segments.

Hawker finished tenth at the 2004 Skate Canada International, her first Grand Prix assignment. After placing fifth at the 2005 Canadian Championships, she was sent to the 2005 Four Continents, where she also placed fifth. She was coached by Michelle and Doug Leigh at the Mariposa Winter Club in Barrie, Ontario.

Richard Callaghan became Hawker's coach in the 2005–06 season. She won bronze at the 2006 Canadian Championships and finished fourth at the 2006 Four Continents. She was the first alternate for the 2006 Winter Olympics and 2006 World Championships. She was featured on the fifth estate, which detailed the journey of five Canadian figure skaters as they worked to qualify for the Olympic team.

The following season, Hawker repeated as the Canadian national bronze medallist and went on to place 7th at the 2007 Four Continents. In the later part of her career, she trained at the Toronto Cricket, Skating and Curling Club and Onyx Skating Academy. She announced her retirement from competitive skating on June 23, 2008.

Programs

Competitive highlights
GP: Grand Prix

References

External links

 
 Official website

1981 births
Canadian female single skaters
Living people
Sportspeople from North York
Figure skaters from Toronto
Universiade medalists in figure skating
Universiade bronze medalists for Canada
Medalists at the 2003 Winter Universiade